The Men's Flyweight Weightlifting Event (– 52 kg) is the lightest men's event at the weightlifting competition, limiting competitors to a maximum of 52 kilograms of body mass. The competition took place on 26 July in the Pavelló de l'Espanya Industrial and was the first weightlifting event to conclude at the 1992 Summer Olympics.

Each lifter performed in both the snatch and clean and jerk lifts, with the final score being the sum of the lifter's best result in each. The athlete received three attempts in each of the two lifts; the score for the lift was the heaviest weight successfully lifted.  Ties were broken by the lifter with the lightest body weight.

Results

References

Weightlifting at the 1992 Summer Olympics